The Royal Scottish Academy building, the home of the Royal Scottish Academy, is situated on The Mound in the centre of Edinburgh, was built by William Henry Playfair in 1822-6 and extended in 1831-6 for the Board of Manufactures and Fisheries. Along with the adjacent National Gallery of Scotland, their neo-classical design helped transform Edinburgh into a modern-day Athens of the North.

One of the bodies that proposed the building in 1821 was the Royal Institution for the Encouragement of the Fine Arts in Scotland after which the building was named the Royal Institution from 1826 to 1911. From the completion of the original building, the Royal Institution shared it with the Board of Manufactures (the owners), the Royal Society of Edinburgh and the Society of Antiquaries of Scotland.

The building, along with the National Gallery of Scotland, was remodelled in 1912 by William Thomas Oldrieve.  The statue of Queen Victoria atop the building was sculpted by Sir John Steell.

In 2003 railings (lost in World War II) together with a series of traditional lamps, were restored around both the Academy and the National Gallery behind, isolating each building from the public space here.

The building is managed by the National Galleries of Scotland but a 1910 Order grants the RSA permanent administration offices in the building. The building was recently refurbished as part of the Playfair Project.

Exhibition space is shared throughout the year by the RSA with the NGS and other exhibiting societies: the Society of Scottish Artists, Visual Arts Scotland and the Royal Society of Watercolourists.

References

Buildings and structures in Edinburgh
National Galleries of Scotland
New Town, Edinburgh
Category A listed buildings in Edinburgh
Neoclassical architecture in Scotland